Tetrathemis is a genus of dragonflies in the family Libellulidae.
Species of Tetrathemis are found in Africa, Madagascar, Asia, New Guinea and Australia.

Species
The genus Tetrathemis includes the following species:
Tetrathemis camerunensis 
Tetrathemis corduliformis 
Tetrathemis denticauda 
Tetrathemis flavescens 
Tetrathemis fraseri  - treefall elf
Tetrathemis godiardi 
Tetrathemis irregularis  - rainforest elf
Tetrathemis irregularis cladophila -  - rainforest elf
Tetrathemis leptoptera 
Tetrathemis longfieldae 
Tetrathemis platyptera 
Tetrathemis polleni  - black-splashed elf
Tetrathemis ruwensoriensis 
Tetrathemis victoriae 
Tetrathemis yerburii

References

Libellulidae
Anisoptera genera
Odonata of Oceania
Odonata of Africa
Odonata of Asia
Odonata of Australia
Taxa named by Friedrich Moritz Brauer
Taxonomy articles created by Polbot